Astanlı or Astanly may refer to:
 Astanlı, Jalilabad, Azerbaijan
 Astanlı, Neftchala, Azerbaijan
 Astanlı, Yardymli, Azerbaijan
 Aşağı Astanlı, Azerbaijan
 Yuxarı Astanlı, Azerbaijan